The Troubled Crusade: American Education, 1945–1980 is a 1983 history book by Diane Ravitch that describes the postwar progressive education movement and American school reform of the mid-20th century.

References

External links 

 

1983 non-fiction books
English-language books
History books about education
Basic Books books